John Michael Gaudreau (born August 13, 1993) is an American professional ice hockey winger for the Columbus Blue Jackets of the National Hockey League (NHL). He played for the NCAA Division I's Boston College Eagles from 2011 to 2014. Gaudreau was selected by the Calgary Flames in the fourth round, 104th overall, of the 2011 NHL Entry Draft. Nicknamed "Johnny Hockey," he was the 2014 winner of the Hobey Baker Award as the best player in the NCAA, and, during his first full NHL season in 2014–15, he was selected to play in the 2015 NHL All-Star Game and was a Calder Memorial Trophy finalist for the NHL's best rookie. He won the Lady Byng Memorial Trophy as the NHL's most gentlemanly player for the 2016–17 season.

Early life
Gaudreau was born in Salem, New Jersey, and grew up in Carneys Point Township, New Jersey. As a youth, Gaudreau played for Penns Grove little league baseball, and played in the 2006 Quebec International Pee-Wee Hockey Tournament with a minor ice hockey team from Hershey, Pennsylvania. He attended Gloucester Catholic High School in Gloucester City, New Jersey, across the Delaware River from Philadelphia. He graduated from Dubuque Senior High School in Dubuque, Iowa.

Playing career

USHL
Gaudreau played the 2010–11 season with the Dubuque Fighting Saints in the United States Hockey League (USHL), where he played in the 2011 USHL All-Star Game and helped his team win the Clark Cup as the USHL champions. Gaudreau's outstanding play during the season was rewarded with him being selected to the USHL All-Rookie Team and to the All-USHL Second Team. He was also recognized as the USHL Rookie of the Year.

Gaudreau was selected in the 4th round, 104th overall, in the 2011 NHL Entry Draft by the Calgary Flames. Listed at 5'6", Gaudreau was one of the shortest players taken at the Draft.

NCAA
After attending the Calgary Flames’ training camp ahead of the 2011–12 season, Gaudreau started his career in the NCAA with the Division I Boston College Eagles team in the Hockey East conference. He originally signed a Letter of Intent to play with Hockey East rival Northeastern University, but opted for Boston College when Northeastern Hockey head coach Greg Cronin resigned in June 2011 to take a position with the NHL's Toronto Maple Leafs.

As a freshman at Boston College, Gaudreau scored 21 goals and 23 assists (44 points) in 44 games, leading all freshmen in scoring. He played an integral part in Boston College's win in the team's National Championship, scoring a highlight-reel goal late in the third period in their 4–1 win in the final over Ferris State University. Gaudreau was awarded the Bill Flynn Trophy as the Most Valuable Player of the Hockey East Championship Tournament. He also helped the Eagles win the traditional Beanpot Tournament for the third year in a row and was named Beanpot MVP after the tournament.

In his sophomore campaign, Gaudreau emerged as the star of the team and improved upon his already impressive stats, achieving a 21–30–51 scoring line in 35 games, leading the nation in points per game, at 1.46. He then led the Eagles to a fourth consecutive Beanpot championship after helping to win a gold medal for the United States at the 2013 World Juniors. Despite losing to archrival Boston University in the Hockey East tournament semi-finals and bowing out of the NCAA tournament in the first round against Union College, he was awarded Hockey East Player of the Year and was named an ACHA First Team All-American for his tremendous offensive output. On April 3, 2013, Gaudreau was named one of the three finalists for the 2013 Hobey Baker Award, along with Eric Hartzell and Drew LeBlanc. St. Cloud State's Drew LeBlanc eventually won the award.

Gaudreau opted to remain at Boston College for his junior year, despite rumors of him turning professional and joining the Calgary Flames. One of the main reasons he stayed, he claimed, was to play with his younger brother Matthew, who joined the team in the fall. Gaudreau's decision to remain was fortunate for Boston College, as he dominated the NCAA in every major scoring category, scoring 36 goals and 44 assists for 80 points in 40 games, a 2.00 point per game pace, the highest production by any player in the country since 2003. After a 5–4 Eagles loss to Holy Cross in November, Gaudreau was paired up with Bill Arnold and Kevin Hayes on a line, which quickly became collegiate hockey's most offensively-potent line, producing 46 goals and 68 assists for 114 points as a trio. In addition, Gaudreau tied Paul Kariya's record for the Hockey East single season scoring streak at 31 games, scoring 29 goals and 61 points during the span. For his tremendous season, he was named the league's Player of the Year for the second straight season, as well as the league's scoring champion with 36 points in 20 games, and was named a unanimous First-Team All-Star. He was also named a Hobey Baker top ten finalist on March 20 and a top three "Hobey Hat Trick" finalist for the second-straight year on April 2.

Although the team lost to Union College in the Frozen Four on April 11, Gaudreau was named the 2014 recipient of the Hobey Baker Award, awarded to the NCAA's top ice hockey player.

Calgary Flames

2013–14
Gaudreau entered the NHL on the same day of his receiving of the Hobey Baker award. On April 11, 2014, shortly after the ceremony, Gaudreau and Eagles' teammate Bill Arnold signed entry-level contracts with the Calgary Flames, Arnold having been drafted by Calgary in 2010. Both made their NHL debut in the Flames' final game of the 2013–14 season, against the Vancouver Canucks. Gaudreau scored the Flames' only goal on his first shot of his first professional game.

2014–15

To begin the 2014–15 season, Gaudreau earned a spot on the Flames' roster to continue his NHL career. Starting off slowly, Gaudreau did not record a point until the sixth game of the year. However, he then heated up quickly, amassing 12 goals and 30 points through 37 games. He scored his first career NHL hat-trick against Jonathan Quick on December 22, 2014, in a 4–3 comeback win over the Los Angeles Kings, becoming the youngest Flames player to record a hat-trick since Joe Nieuwendyk in the 1987–88 season.

Gaudreau was selected to play in the 2015 NHL All-Star Game in Columbus, Ohio, on January 25, 2015, and participated in the Skills Competition, garnering attention with Jakub Voráček for their antics during the shootout challenge. The shootout move, which imitated the previous move performed by Ryan Johansen (who helped seven-year-old Cole Vogt, the son of Columbus Blue Jackets trainer Mike Vogt, score a goal on Corey Crawford) went viral. Voráček, who went immediately after Johansen, "helped" Gaudreau score a goal in the same manner as Johansen did with Vogt, making fun of Gaudreau's size and youth, as his small stature in comparison to other NHLers led some to believe he looks like a child. Gaudreau was originally named to the All-Star Skills Competition Rookie Team, limited to only the competition portion, but was promoted to the All-Star Game itself as a replacement to Sidney Crosby, who could not play due to injury. Gaudreau was named to Team Toews and recorded two assists in the game, both on goals scored by the Nashville Predators' Filip Forsberg.

On March 11, 2015, Gaudreau scored his 50th point of the season, becoming the first Flames rookie to reach the mark since Jarome Iginla in 1996–97. Gaudreau finished the regular season tied for the rookie scoring lead with Mark Stone of the Ottawa Senators. Gaudreau had 24 goals and led all rookies with 40 assists, while Stone had 26 goals. He was a finalist for the Calder Memorial Trophy as the NHL's best rookie, but the award went to Aaron Ekblad of the Florida Panthers, with Gaudreau finishing third. He was named to the NHL's All-Rookie team for the 2014–15 season.

2015–16
The 2015–16 season was a banner year for Gaudreau, as the sophomore set career highs in goals, assists and points en route to finishing tied for sixth among all NHL players in total points. For the second straight year, Gaudreau participated in the NHL All-Star Game, the 61st in NHL history. Gaudreau was selected as a finalist to be the All-Star Game MVP, an honor eventually given to controversial and unlikely write-in candidate John Scott. However, Gaudreau's Flames failed to live up to high expectations bestowed upon them after their surprisingly successful 2014–15 season, finishing 26th in the NHL and missing the Stanley Cup playoffs for the sixth time in seven seasons.

2016–17
Gaudreau missed the entirety of the Flames' training camp due to a contract dispute. On October 10, 2016, two days before the Flames' season opener, Gaudreau signed a six-year, $40.5 million contract worth $6.75 million annually. On November 16, 2016, in a game against the Minnesota Wild, Gaudreau suffered a finger fracture. He had surgery the following day. Despite speculation he would miss up to six weeks of the season, Gaudreau returned after ten games. Gaudreau finished the season with 61 points in 72 games, leading the Flames in scoring. Gaudreau also recorded two assists in four games during the team's first round matchup against the Anaheim Ducks in the 2017 playoffs.

2017–18
Gaudreau set a career-high in points scored during the 2017–18 season, leading the Flames and finishing top-20 in the NHL with 84; his 60 assists finished within the top-10 for the category. He was named an NHL All-Star for the fourth consecutive year, but would not participate in the playoffs as the Flames came up short of a late-season push for the last wild card spot in the Western Conference.

2018–19
The 2018–19 season proved to be Gaudreau's best regular season to date. He finished with a career best 99 points, including career highs in goals (36), assists (63), and points (99). He was tied for seventh place in league scoring. The Flames won the Pacific Division, and were the Western Conference's top seed heading into the 2019 Stanley Cup playoffs. Gaudreau finished fourth in voting for the Hart Memorial Trophy, awarded by the Professional Hockey Writers' Association to the league's most valuable player.

However, in the first round of the playoffs, the Flames lost to the Colorado Avalanche. Gaudreau managed only one point, an assist, in the five-game series, which was singled out as a key weakness for the Flames in the postseason.

2019–20
Following his success in 2018–19, Gaudreau had a disappointing season, hitting career lows of only 18 goals and 40 assists in 70 games. The onset of the COVID-19 pandemic lead to the regular season being prematurely halted in March. The NHL eventually arranged to hold the 2020 Stanley Cup playoffs in a bubble in Edmonton and Toronto. The Flames had been eighth in the Western Conference at the time the regular season was suspended, and so played the ninth-place Winnipeg Jets in a special qualifying round. In Game 1 of the series, Gaudreau scored his first playoff goal since 2015, helping the Flames win the game 4–1. After ousting the Jets 3–1 in the qualifying round, the Flames faced the Dallas Stars in the first round. Gaudreau again struggled to produce in the playoffs, and the Flames lost the series four games to two.

2020–21
Due to the ongoing pandemic, the NHL realigned its divisions temporarily for a shortened season. To eliminate cross-border travel, all seven Canadian teams played in the North Division. The year began slowly for Gaudreau, and further difficulties arose when coach Geoff Ward was replaced midway through the season by Darryl Sutter. Adjusting to Sutter's style was challenging, and Gaudreau posted only seven points in a span of fifteen games following the switch. However, his scoring improved dramatically during the final months of the regular season, alongside general improvement of the team. He recorded his 300th career assist on a goal by teammate Sam Bennett in a game against the Edmonton Oilers. Gaudreau again lead the Flames in goals (19) and assists (30) during the regular season. The Flames did not qualify for the 2021 Stanley Cup playoffs, coming four points short of the Montreal Canadiens for the final berth in the North Division.

2021–22
The NHL's divisions and format returned to their pre-pandemic norms for the 2021–22 season, the Flames' first full season on returning coach Sutter. It would prove to be one of the most successful regular seasons in team history, with Gaudreau at the center of its success. With centreman Elias Lindholm and left winger Matthew Tkachuk, he formed one of the most dominant forward lines in the NHL, and all three members hit numerous personal and collective milestones over the course of the season. On April 12, he hit the 100-point mark for the first time in his career. Gaudreau scored his 40th goal of the season in an April 29 loss to the Minnesota Wild, joining Lindholm and Tkachuk in this feat, the first time in 28 years that linemates had all achieved this, and only the fourth time in that span that a team had three 40-goal scorers. He finished the season with 40 goals and 75 assists for 115 points, finishing second overall in points standings for the Art Ross Trophy, behind only Connor McDavid. This was also the second-most points ever for a Flame, behind only Kent Nilsson (131) in 1980–81. Gaudreau's performance through the season led many to argue that he should be a serious candidate for the Hart Memorial Trophy, though he was ultimately not a finalist, finishing fourth in the voting. The Flames won the Pacific Division and finished sixth in the league.

The Flames drew the Dallas Stars in the first round of the 2022 Stanley Cup playoffs, a rematch of the bubble playoffs two years prior, and a matchup in which the Flames were considered the favourites. In light of disappointing results in preceding years, Gaudreau's prospective performance was the subject of considerable speculation. The Stars proved a greater challenge than many had anticipated, largely due to an exceptional performance from goaltender Jake Oettinger. After falling behind 2 games to 1, Gaudreau scored the game-winning goal to help tie the series in Game 4, his first of the playoffs. His performance through the early games earned the praise of coach Sutter, who said he felt that Gaudreau had "taken that step" to perform as well in the playoffs as he had during the regular season. Gaudreau's second goal of the playoffs was also a game-winner, this time in overtime in Game 7, sending the Flames through to the second round for the first time in seven years. The Flames drew the Edmonton Oilers in the second round, the first playoff "Battle of Alberta" in 31 years. The Flames were defeated by the Oilers in five games, bringing the playoff run to an end.

With the pending expiration of Gaudreau's contract, he was regarded as the top unrestricted free agent of 2022 by many, and whether the Flames would be able to re-sign him was a topic of considerable discussion. On July 12, 2022, the Flames announced that Gaudreau would not return to Calgary despite an aggressive internal campaign by the club to re-sign him, including a monetary package that would have made Gaudreau one of the highest paid players in the league. General Manager Brad Treliving described Gaudreau's decision as a "disappointing day, to say the very least," but noted Gaudreau's desire to move closer to his family, saying "I respect that fully. John has every right, and we have nothing but respect for John the player and John the person."

Columbus Blue Jackets
On July 13, the opening day of free agency, Gaudreau agreed to a seven-year, $68.25 million contract with an average annual value of $9.75 million with the Columbus Blue Jackets, accepting less money than offered by Calgary and comparable deals offered by the New Jersey Devils and New York Islanders to play for the club. His decision to sign in Columbus "stunned" the hockey world, both because it had not been among the most commonly mooted destinations beforehand and because Columbus had acquired a reputation as an undesirable destination for free agents. Blue Jackets general manager Jarmo Kekäläinen expressed the hope that with the signing "we can finally get rid of the bullshit that this is somehow a bad destination, a bad city, whatever. Because it’s never been true."

International play

In 2013, Gaudreau was selected to represent the United States in the 2013 World Junior Ice Hockey Championships. He led the entire tournament with seven goals and tied for the team lead with nine points, as the U.S. won the gold medal. Highlighted by a hat-trick in the quarter-finals against the Czech Republic and another two goals against Canada in the semi-finals, he was named to the tournament All-Star Team.

In 2014, Gaudreau was named to the senior United States team that played in the 2014 IIHF World Championship in Minsk, Belarus. He scored his first international goal as a professional in a pre-tournament game against Germany, scoring the second goal in a 3–1 victory. He scored in the first official game of the tournament, the third goal in a 5–1 victory over hosts Belarus. Although the U.S. bowed out of the tournament in a quarter-finals loss to the Czech Republic, Gaudreau finished the tournament tenth in scoring, with two goals and eight assists for ten points, including a four-point performance in a 5–4 win over Germany.

In 2016, Gaudreau joined Team North America for play at the 2016 World Cup of Hockey, playing alongside other NHL stars from both the United States and Canada who were 23 years old and under at the time. He scored four points in three games, two goals and two assists.

In 2018, Gaudreau was named to the American squad to compete at the 2018 IIHF World Championship. He scored one goal and eight assists during the tournament en route to a bronze medal for the U.S.

On April 19, 2019, Gaudreau was selected to represent Team USA at the 2019 IIHF World Championship, held in Bratislava and Košice, Slovakia.

Personal life

Gaudreau's younger brother Matthew is also a professional hockey player and currently plays on the Reading Royals of the ECHL. He previously played for the Bridgeport Sound Tigers of the American Hockey League (AHL) and their ECHL affiliate, the Worcester Railers. Gaudreau and his brother played together at Boston College during the 2013–14 season. His parents are Guy and Jane Gaudreau. Guy Gaudreau is a native of Beebe Plain, Vermont. He played college hockey at Norwich, after playing high school hockey at North Country Union High School, and was inducted into the Vermont Sports Hall of Fame. He settled in southern New Jersey and spent 11 years coaching hockey at Gloucester Catholic.

In January 2015, Gaudreau filed a trademark application for the nickname "Johnny Hockey" in both Canada and the U.S. due to concerns people would abuse his nickname for their own marketing gain.

Career statistics

Regular season and playoffs

International

Awards and honors

References

External links
 

1993 births
Living people
AHCA Division I men's ice hockey All-Americans
American expatriate ice hockey players in Canada
American men's ice hockey left wingers
Boston College Eagles men's ice hockey players
Calgary Flames draft picks
Calgary Flames players
Columbus Blue Jackets players
Dubuque Fighting Saints players
Gloucester Catholic High School alumni
Hobey Baker Award winners
Ice hockey players from New Jersey
Lady Byng Memorial Trophy winners
National Hockey League All-Stars
People from Carneys Point Township, New Jersey
People from Salem, New Jersey
Sportspeople from Salem County, New Jersey
USA Hockey National Team Development Program players